Mareks Ārents (born 6 August 1986) is a Latvian track and field athlete competing in the pole vault.  He has won the Latvian national championship 12 times. His personal record is 5.70 m, set in Jablonec in 2016.  It is the second-best vault in the history of Latvian pole vault behind Aleksandrs Obižajevs's Latvian record (5.80 m).

He qualified for 2012 Summer Olympics in London, but did not reach the final.  He also competed at the 2013 and 2015 World Championships.

At the 2013 European Indoor Championships he jumped 5.50 m, ranking him in 11th place, missing the final by 10 cm.  In the Polish city of Bydgoszcz, at the XIII European Athletic Festival Ārents won the pole vault with a vault of 5.50 m.

Competition record

References 

 http://www.olimpiade.lv/londona/olimpiska-delegacija/sportisti/vieglatletika/50-mareks-arents

External links 
 

1986 births
Athletes from Riga
Latvian male pole vaulters
Living people
Athletes (track and field) at the 2012 Summer Olympics
Athletes (track and field) at the 2016 Summer Olympics
Olympic athletes of Latvia
World Athletics Championships athletes for Latvia
Competitors at the 2013 Summer Universiade